James C. Conwell was the president of Rose-Hulman Institute of Technology in Terre Haute, Indiana, United States, where he was derogatorily referred to as "safety Jim". He has also served on the faculty at Vanderbilt University, Louisiana State University, and Grove City College.

Education
Conwell earned the B.S. and M.S. in mechanical engineering from the University of Tennessee, then worked at Procter & Gamble. He earned a doctorate in mechanical engineering at Vanderbilt University. He later worked for Jacobs Engineering.

Personal life
Conwell is married to Angela Conwell, who is also a mechanical engineer. They have two children.

References

Heads of universities and colleges in the United States
University of Tennessee alumni
Vanderbilt University faculty
Louisiana State University faculty
Grove City College faculty
Vanderbilt University alumni
Living people
Year of birth missing (living people)